Comet Skjellerup–Maristany, formally designated C/1927 X1, 1927 IX, and 1927k, was a long-period comet which became very bright in 1927. This great comet was observable to the naked eye for about 32 days. It was independently discovered by amateur astronomers John Francis Skjellerup in Australia on November 28, 1927 and Edmundo Maristany in Argentina on December 6, 1927, and noted for its strong yellow appearance, caused by emission from sodium atoms.

Forward scattering of light on December 15 and 16 of 1927 allowed the comet to be seen during daylight if the observer blocked the Sun. C/1927 X1 passed only 1.4° from the Sun on 1927-Dec-15.

The comet was mentioned in J. R. R. Tolkien's book Letters From Father Christmas.

References

External links 
 Orbital simulation from JPL (Java) / Horizons Ephemeris

Non-periodic comets
19271206
Great comets